Ogden is a residential neighbourhood in the southeast quadrant of Calgary, Alberta. It includes the districts of Lynnwood and Millican Estates. It is bounded by Glenmore Trail to the south, Deerfoot Trail and the Bow River to the west, and the CPR tracks and the industrial areas of Ogden Shops to the north and east.

Ogden was established in 1912. It is named after I.G. Ogden, former VP of the Canadian Pacific Railway, while the district of Millican takes its name from the Millican family, homesteaders of the early 1900s. It is represented in the Calgary City Council by the Ward 9 councillor.

The postal code in this area is T2C.

Demographics

Residents in this community had a median household income of $47,500 in 2000, and there were 18.1% low income residents living in the neighbourhood. As of 2000, 14.6% of the residents were immigrants. A proportion of 19.9% of the buildings were condominiums or apartments, and 33.3% of the housing was used for renting.

Economics
In December 2012, CP Rail decided to relocate its corporate head offices to Ogden.  This move will involve building new corporate offices within the existing century-old Ogden rail yard.

Education
The community is served by Banting & Best Elementary and Sherwood Community public schools, as well as St. Bernadette Elementary School (Catholic).

See also
List of neighbourhoods in Calgary

References

External links
Millican - Ogden Community Association
Catholic Board website
Public Board website

Neighbourhoods in Calgary